The House of Gwynedd is the Royal house of the Kingdom of Gwynedd, in Medieval Wales, and is divided between the House of Cunedda and the House of Aberffraw.

History
The House of Gwynedd, divided between the earlier House of Cunedda, which lasted from c.401 to 825, was eventually replaced by the later House of Aberffraw, beginning in 844. The first is so named after Cunedda (386-460), the founding King of Gwynedd; and the second after Aberffraw, the old capital of Gwynedd. This House was the first not being descended from the male line of Cunedda. Through inheritances from the great uncle of Merfyn the Oppressor, the line of Cunedda continued from the maternal side through the House of Aberffraw.

The Senior line of the House of Aberffraw descended from Prince Llywelyn the Great in patriline succession and became extinct on the death of Owain Lawgoch in 1378.

Lineage
Under the laws of Hywel Dda, which were adapted from the much earlier pagan Molmutine Laws, any son can inherit from his father. This refers even to illegitimate sons if they are acknowledged by their father. The throne cannot be inherited through the female line unless both her father and the ancestry of her spouse were royal. In many examples cousins were inter-married, which made the distinction somewhat academic.

The House of Aberffraw began with the accession of Rhodri Mawr to the throne of Gwynedd. His father Merfyn Frych ap Gwriad had seized the throne of Gwynedd on the death of the last of the old royal line Hywel ap Rhodri Molwynog. He was his maternal grandnephew via the former king's niece Esyllt verch Cynan ap Rhodri Molwynog.

See also

References

 
 01
Welsh royal houses
Medieval Wales